Kapone is a surname. Notable people with the name include:

Al Kapone (born 1973), American rapper
Jérémy Kapone (born 1990) French actor, singer and songwriter

See also
Capone (surname)
 K.Pone.Inc, record label
 Kpone, Kpone Katamanso District, Ghana